Roth is an unincorporated community in Alexander County, Illinois, United States. Roth is located near the Mississippi River northwest of Cairo.

References

Unincorporated communities in Alexander County, Illinois
Unincorporated communities in Illinois
Cape Girardeau–Jackson metropolitan area